Tovjiyeh-ye Bala (also Romanized as Ţovjīyeh-ye Bālā; also known as Toveyjīyeh-ye Pā’īn and Ţovjīyeh) is a village in Jarahi Rural District, in the Central District of Mahshahr County, Khuzestan Province, Iran. At the 2006 census, its population was 150, in 22 families.

References 

Populated places in Mahshahr County